Tanwei Station, formerly Datansha South Station and Datansha Station during planning, is an elevated station on Line 5 of the Guangzhou Metro and an underground station on Line 6. It is located at Zhongshuangqiao Park on Datansha Island in the Liwan District. It opened on 28 December 2009. It became an interchange station between Line 5 and Line 6 on 28December 2013.

Station layout

Exits

Others 
Another station in Line 6 on Datansha Island, Datansha North Station was renamed as Hesha Station.

References

Railway stations in China opened in 2009
Guangzhou Metro stations in Liwan District